Jozef Petrulák (born 23 August 1994 in Čadca) is a Slovak luger.

Petrulák competed at the 2014 Winter Olympics for Slovakia. In the Doubles he competed with Marián Zemaník, finishing 16th. He was also a part of the Slovak relay team, which finished 10th.

As of September 2014, Petrulák's best Luge World Cup overall finish is 16th in 2013–14.

References

External links
 

1994 births
Living people
Slovak male lugers
Lugers at the 2014 Winter Olympics
Olympic lugers of Slovakia
People from Čadca
Sportspeople from the Žilina Region
Lugers at the 2012 Winter Youth Olympics